Gayrettepe is an underground rapid transit station on the M2 line of the Istanbul Metro. It is located in east-central Şişli under Büyükdere Avenue just south of Levent. The station opened on 16 September 2000 and is one of the original six stations of the M2 line. In 2007 a connection to the Istanbul Metrobus at Zincirlikuyu junction was built. Gayrettepe has an island platform serviced by two tracks.

Gayrettepe will also be the southeastern terminus of the M11 line, which will run northwest to the Istanbul Airport.

M2 Platform
Layout

M11 Platform
Layout

References

Railway stations opened in 2000
Istanbul metro stations
Şişli
2000 establishments in Turkey
Istanbul Central Business District
Rapid transit stations under construction in Turkey